Cratopodini is a weevil tribe in the subfamily Entiminae.

Genera 
Cratopophilus – Cratopopsis – Cratopus – Hemicratopus – Lujaiella – Pseudiphisus – Scaevinus – Stiamus – Zyrcosoides

References 

 Alonso-Zarazaga, M.A. & Lyal, C.H.C. (1999) A world catalogue of families and genera of Curculionoidea (Insecta: Coleoptera) excluding Scolytidae and Platypodidae. Entomopraxis, Barcelona, Spain, 315 pp. https://weevil.myspecies.info/sites/weevil.info/files/Alonso-Zarazaga%20%26%20Lyal,%201999_World%20Catalogue%20%28searchable%29.pdf
Bouchard, P., Bousquet, Y., Davies, A., Alonso-Zarazaga, M., Lawrence, J., Lyal, C., Newton, A., Reid, C., Schmitt, M., Slipinski, A. & Smith, A. (2011) Family-group names in Coleoptera (Insecta). ZooKeys 88, 1–972. https://doi.org/10.3897/zookeys.88.807
Hustache, A. 1919: Synopsis des Curculionides de la Faune Malgache. I. Brachydérides et Otiorrhynchides. Annales de la Société Entomologique de France, 87(3-4): 441-520

External links 

Entiminae
Beetle tribes